Scott M. Lephart is an American sports medicine scholar currently the Dean of the University of Kentucky College of Health Sciences and also formerly a Distinguished Professor at University of Pittsburgh.

Lephart earned an undergraduate degree at Marietta College and masters and doctoral degrees in sports medicine at the University of Virginia.

References

University of Kentucky faculty
University of Pittsburgh faculty
American sports physicians
Marietta College alumni
University of Virginia School of Medicine alumni
Living people
Year of birth missing (living people)